Mee pok is a Chinese noodle characterized by its flat and yellow appearance, varying in thickness and width. The dish is of Teochew origin and is commonly served in the Chaoshan region of China and countries with a significant Teochew Chinese immigrant population such as Singapore, Malaysia and Thailand. Mee pok is commonly served tossed in a sauce (often referred to as "dry", or tah in Hokkien), though sometimes served in a soup (where it is referred to as "soup", or terng). Meat and vegetables are added on top.

Mee pok can be categorised into two variants, fish ball mee pok (yu wan mee pok), and mushroom minced meat mee pok (bak chor mee). Bak chor mee is usually prepared using thin noodles ("mee kia") (widely known as wanton style noodles or youmian) or mee pok, while yu wan mee can also be prepared in both styles or other noodle varieties.

Mee pok is a staple commonly offered in hawker centres and coffee shops (Kopitiams in parts of Southeast Asia) in Singapore, together with other Chinese noodle dishes.

Mee pok sauce 
The sauce in which the noodles are tossed in is a very important aspect of the dish, and is considered a representation of the cook's skill and experience. The importance of the sauce in mee pok can be thought of similarly as the sauces that accompany pasta.

The sauce consists of 4 components: chili, oil, vinegar and other condiments such as soy sauce and pepper. The chili is made from various ingredients and its preparation often includes frying and blending. Oil, traditionally lard, ensures a smooth texture in the noodles, although vegetable oil is sometimes used as a healthier though less tasty version. Vinegar is added for its sourness, and diners may specify how much vinegar is used.

The chili sauce may be replaced with tomato ketchup for children and others who are uncomfortable with the spiciness of the chili.

Soup 
Soup is served in a bowl as a side dish accompanying the "dry" variant, or served together with the noodles for the "soup" version where the sauce is omitted. Traditionally, the soup is boiled and simmered overnight with old hen, pork bones, dried sole fish, and soybean. The resulting broth is rich in taste and cloudy in appearance.

Mee pok noodles 

Usually, the noodles are factory-made, and requires substantial preparation before cooking. Different hawkers prepare and cook their noodles differently, but the desired outcome is the same: springy al dente noodles.

Hawkers often toss the noodles vigorously to remove excess flour and soda and to separate noodles which have stuck together. Other processes include stretching the noodles, cutting into a desired length, and separating into serving portions.

The cooking process of the noodles consists of blanching in hot and cold water multiple times, though some hawkers omit the cold water. The noodles are drained and placed in either sauce or broth.

Bak chor mee 
Bak chor mee, which translates to minced meat noodles, is a Singaporean noodle dish popularly sold as street food in hawker centers and food courts. The noodles are tossed in vinegar, minced meat, pork slices, pork liver, stewed sliced mushrooms, meat balls and bits of deep-fried lard. Bak chor mee can be categorised into two variants: a dry version and a soup version. Most dry versions come with slices of stewed mushroom, minced pork, slices of lean pork and sometimes fried ikan bilis, atop noodles tossed in a punchy chilli-vinegar sauce, while soup versions are lauded for the depth of pork flavour in its broth. Singapore's bak chor mee was listed as the top world street food by World Street Food Congress.

Fish ball mee pok 

It can be made with the addition or omission of any of the toppings, prepared in soup or "dry" style, and either with or without the chili sauce.

Other types of toppings 
Newer varieties of toppings include deep fried dumplings, abalone slices, imitation crab stick, and other processed fish products.

In popular culture 
 Mee Pok Man is the title of a film directed by Eric Khoo, a Singaporean film director.
 Bak chor mee featured prominently in an episode of The Mr Brown Show, which satirized the James Gomez saga during the 2006 Singapore general elections.

See also
 Chinese noodles

References

Chinese noodle dishes
Teochew cuisine
Malaysian noodle dishes
Singaporean noodle dishes